The Conejos River is a tributary of the Rio Grande, approximately  long, in south-central Colorado in the United States. It drains a scenic area of the eastern San Juan Mountains west of the San Luis Valley.

Description
It flows briefly northeast, through Platoro Reservoir, then southeast through the Rio Grande National Forest, then east along the New Mexico border through a scenic canyon. It enters the southwestern corner of the San Luis Valley from the west near Conejos and joins the Rio Grande from the west approximately 15 mi (24 km) southeast of Alamosa. It is impounded at Platoro Reservoir for flood control and to manage irrigation in the San Luis Valley, as part of the San Luis Valley Project of the U.S. Bureau of Reclamation.

The river is wide and shallow along much of its course. It descends steeply in several areas, including at Pinnacle Canyon, a popular destination for whitewater rafting.

Off limits to white settlement during the New Spain years, the river was the site of early land grants to settlers from the government of Mexico in the 1830s. The first settlement of 50 families along the river, in the Guadalupe Grant in 1833, was destroyed in an attack by Native Americans. José Jacques established the first white settlement on the river in 1851. The town of Conejos was founded in the 1854 by Lafayette Head, who later became the first lieutenant governor of Colorado.

See also

 List of Colorado rivers
 List of tributaries of the Rio Grande

References

External links

 USGR: San Luis Valley Project
 Rio Grande's Hispanic Heritage

Tributaries of the Rio Grande
Rivers of Colorado
Rivers of Conejos County, Colorado
San Juan Mountains (Colorado)
San Luis Valley of Colorado